La Grande Danse Macabre is the seventh studio album by Swedish black metal band Marduk. It was recorded and mixed at The Abyss in December 2000 and released on March 5, 2001, by Regain Records.  La Grande Danse Macabre is the last Marduk album with Fredrik Andersson on drums.

The Century Media release has different cover art, one found on T-shirts.

The album's title is French for "The Great Dance of Death".

The title track ends with a quote from Johan Olof Wallins poem "Angel of Death".

Themes
On La Grande Danse Macabre, the theme is death. The lyrical themes are primarily reflective of this, with litterings present of the Satanic themes on which the band initially based themselves. The band's previous albums had been themed on  blood (Nightwing) and fire (Panzer Division Marduk), forming a trilogy of "Blood, Fire and Death", Marduk's vision of what black metal is.

Track listing

Personnel
Marduk
 Legion – vocals
 Morgan Steinmeyer Håkansson – guitar
 B. War – bass guitar
 Fredrik Andersson – drums

Guest
 Peter Tägtgren – mixing

References

2001 albums
Marduk (band) albums
Century Media Records albums
Regain Records albums